Ipixuna River may refer to:

 Ipixuna River (Juruá River)
 Ipixuna River (Madeira River)
 Ipixuna River (Purus River)

See also 
 Ipixuna